Lampronia intermediella is a moth of the family Prodoxidae. It is found in Slovakia and Romania.

The wingspan is about 16.5 mm. The forewings are shining yellowish brown, with two cream white spots on the termen.

The larvae feed on Corylus species. They initially mine the leaves of their host plant. Later, they create a case and become vagrant on the forest floor.

References

Moths described in 1870
Prodoxidae
Moths of Europe